Intruder is an American thrash metal band from Nashville, Tennessee. Formerly known as "Transgresser", the group began as a four-piece cover band. They saw the addition of rhythm guitarist Greg Messick after signing with Metal Blade Records.

Intruder released three full-length albums and one EP from 1987 to 1991 before splitting up in 1992. Since then, the band has reunited several times to play live shows.

History 
The band was originally formed in 1984 under the name "Transgresser". They released demos in 1984 and 1986 (which would later appear on a re-release of their debut album). After going through several name changes they became known as "Intruder". They released their debut album Live to Die in 1987 as a four-piece band in the speed metal vein.

The band signed with Metal Blade Records in 1989. The Metal Blade years saw the entry of rhythm guitarist Greg Messick. Intruder released their second album, A Higher Form of Killing, in 1989 as a five-piece band. It presented a move away from speed metal to the thrash metal scene. Intruder released the very rare Escape from Pain EP in 1990. Admittedly released as "an excuse to tour", it featured songs recorded on previous releases as well as a cover of "25 or 6 to 4" by Chicago. It featured just one new song, the title track. Escape from Pain was the only one of their Metal Blade releases not to be issued on the three formats of CD, cassette and vinyl.

In 1991 Intruder released their final full-length album Psycho Savant. It was their only Metal Blade release to feature all original songs. After five years of releases and touring, the group disbanded in 1992. In a 2006 interview, Guitarist Greg Messick claimed that the band tried to stay together after being dropped from Metal Blade, but were ultimately unwilling due to inevitable lineup changes. Vocalist Jimmy Hamilton responded to the question of the band's split up in the same interview:

Intruder did an impressive amount of touring during their short career. Although very little was done in the way of promotion, Intruder was able to tour for each release in the US, Canada and Mexico and shared stages with the likes of Helstar, Anvil and Morbid Angel. Since 2002, the group has reunited from time to time. They performed at the Classic Metal Fest in Ohio, 2002, and had a headlining spot at the Headbangers Open Air in Germany. They also played the Keep It True festival in Germany in 2007 and a reunion show in their home town of Nashville in November 2011, in honor of the 20th anniversary of Psycho Savant.

In 2004, the band re-released their 1987 debut album Live to Die through Hellion Records with six bonus tracks.

They are presently in the studio working on a 'Best Of' CD which will consist of eight fan-picked tracks from the two Metal Blade Records releases, A Higher Form of Killing and Psycho Savant. It will also contain a brand new track as well. This release sees the return of Todd Nelson on bass. This will be the first time the original Metal Blade lineup will have recorded together since 1991.

2017 was the 30th anniversary of the band.

After a few years on hiatus, Intruder announced a reunion on their Facebook page on October 16, 2019, and that they were planning to play some shows in 2020, including that year's Headbangers Open Air.

Longtime rhythm guitarist Greg Messick died unexpectedly on September 5, 2020, at the age of 55; his death was announced by the band that same day.

Members 
Current members
 Jimmy Hamilton – vocals
 Arthur Vinett – guitar
 Todd Nelson – bass
 John Pieroni – drums

Former members
 Greg Messick – guitar (died 2020)
 Garry Todd
 Chris Veach

Discography 
Studio albums
 Live to Die (1987)
 A Higher Form of Killing (1989)
 Psycho Savant (1991)
 Live to Die – Relived (2004)

EP's
 Escape from Pain (1990)

References

External links 
 Official Facebook page

American thrash metal musical groups
Musical groups established in 1987
Musical groups disestablished in 1992
Musical quintets
Roadrunner Records artists
Ironworks (record label) artists
Metal Blade Records artists
American speed metal musical groups
Heavy metal musical groups from Tennessee
Musical groups from Nashville, Tennessee